These 363 species belong to Torymus, a genus of chalcid wasps in the family Torymidae.

Torymus species

 Torymus absonus Narendran & Kumar, 2005 c g
 Torymus aceris Boucek, 1994 c g
 Torymus acrophilae Ruschka, 1921 c g
 Torymus advenus (Osten-Sacken, 1870) c g b
 Torymus aea (Walker, 1843) c g
 Torymus aeneoscapus (Huber, 1927) c g
 Torymus aereus (Huber, 1927) c g
 Torymus affinis (Fonscolombe, 1832) c g
 Torymus aiolomorphi (Kamijo, 1964) g
 Torymus alaskensis (Huber, 1927) c g
 Torymus ambositrae (Risbec, 1955) (Madagascar)
 Torymus amurensis (Walker, 1874) c g
 Torymus anastativorus Fahringer, 1944 c g
 Torymus angelicae (Walker, 1836) c g
 Torymus anthobiae Ruschka, 1921 c g
 Torymus anthomyiae Ashmead, 1887 c g
 Torymus antiquus (Geoffroy, 1785) g
 Torymus apiomyiae Boucek & Mihajlovic, 1986 c g
 Torymus approximatus Forster, 1841 g
 Torymus arcadius Graham & Gijswijt, 1998 c g
 Torymus arcella Graham & Gijswijt, 1998 c g
 Torymus arcticus (Thomson, 1876) c g
 Torymus argei Boucek, 1994 c g
 Torymus armatus Boheman, 1834 c g
 Torymus arrogans Schrottky, 1907 c g
 Torymus artemisiae Mayr, 1874 c g
 Torymus arundinis (Walker, 1833) c g
 Torymus asphondyliae Kieffer, 1910 c g
 Torymus associatus Forster, 1841 g
 Torymus asteridis (Huber, 1927) c g
 Torymus atheatus Grissell, 1976 c g
 Torymus atriplicis (Huber, 1927) c g b
 Torymus aucupariae (Rodzianko, 1908) c g
 Torymus auratus (Muller, 1764) g
 Torymus austriacus Graham, 1994 c g
 Torymus aztecus Cameron, 1905 c g
 Torymus azureus Boheman, 1834 c g
 Torymus baccharidis (Huber, 1927) c g
 Torymus basalis (Walker, 1833) c g
 Torymus baudysi Boucek, 1954 c g
 Torymus bedeguaris (Linnaeus, 1758) c g b
 Torymus beneficus Yasumatsu & Kamijo, 1979 c g
 Torymus biarticulatus (Mayr, 1885) c g
 Torymus bicoloratus (Huber, 1927) c g
 Torymus bicolorus Xu & He, 2003 c g
 Torymus bifasciipennis (Gahan, 1936) c g
 Torymus biorhizae (Ashmead, 1887) c g
 Torymus boharti Grissell, 1976 c g
 Torymus boops Graham, 1994 c g
 Torymus borealis Thomson, 1876 c g
 Torymus bouceki Graham & Gijswijt, 1998 c g
 Torymus brachyurus Boheman, 1834 c g
 Torymus brevicoxa Zavada, 2001 c g
 Torymus breviscapus Graham & Gijswijt, 1998 c g
 Torymus brodiei (Ashmead, 1887) c g
 Torymus calcaratus Nees, 1834 c g
 Torymus caledonicus Graham & Gijswijt, 1998 c g
 Torymus californicus (Ashmead, 1886) c g b  (oak gall chalcid)
 Torymus canariensis Hedqvist, 1977 c g
 Torymus capillaceus (Huber, 1927) c g
 Torymus capitis (Huber, 1927) c g
 Torymus capitonis Graham & Gijswijt, 1998 c g
 Torymus caudatulus Graham & Gijswijt, 1998 c g
 Torymus caudatus Boheman, 1834 c g
 Torymus cecidomyae (Walker, 1844) c g
 Torymus centor Graham & Gijswijt, 1998 c g
 Torymus cerri (Mayr, 1874) c g
 Torymus chapadae Ashmead, 1904 c g
 Torymus chaubattiensis Bhatnagar, 1952 c g
 Torymus chlorocopes Boheman, 1834 c g
 Torymus chloromerus (Walker, 1833) c g
 Torymus chrysocephalus Boheman, 1834 c g
 Torymus chrysochlorus (Osten-Sacken, 1870) c g
 Torymus cingulatus Nees, 1834 c g
 Torymus citripes (Huber, 1927) c g
 Torymus coccineus (Huber, 1927) c g
 Torymus coeruleus (Ashmead, 1881) c g
 Torymus coloradensis (Huber, 1927) c g
 Torymus condaliae Kieffer, 1910 c g
 Torymus confinis (Walker, 1833) c g
 Torymus confluens Ratzeburg, 1852 c g
 Torymus contractus Dalman, 1820 c g
 Torymus contubernalis Boheman, 1834 c g
 Torymus corni Mayr, 1874 c g
 Torymus crassiceps Graham & Gijswijt, 1998 c g
 Torymus crassus (Breland, 1939) c g
 Torymus cretaceus Graham & Gijswijt, 1998 c g
 Torymus cribratus Kieffer, 1910 c g
 Torymus cruentatus (Huber, 1927) c g
 Torymus cultratus Graham & Gijswijt, 1998 c g
 Torymus cultriventris Ratzeburg, 1844 c g
 Torymus cupratus Boheman, 1834 c g
 Torymus cupreus (Spinola, 1808) c g
 Torymus curticauda Graham & Gijswijt, 1998 c g
 Torymus curtisi Graham & Gijswijt, 1998 c g
 Torymus curvatulus Graham & Gijswijt, 1998 c g
 Torymus cyaneus Walker, 1847 c g
 Torymus cyniphidis (Linnaeus, 1758) g
 Torymus cyprianus Graham & Gijswijt, 1998 c g
 Torymus dasyneurae (Huber, 1927) c g
 Torymus dennoi Grissell, 1976 c g
 Torymus denticulatus (Breland, 1939) c g
 Torymus diabolus Moser, 1965 c g
 Torymus difficilis Nees, 1834 c g
 Torymus dorycnicola (Müller, 1870) g
 Torymus druparum Boheman, 1834 c g
 Torymus dryophantae (Ashmead, 1887) c g
 Torymus dubiosus (Huber, 1927) c g
 Torymus duplicatus (Huber, 1927) c g
 Torymus durus (Osten-Sacken, 1870) c g
 Torymus eadyi Graham & Gijswijt, 1998 c g
 Torymus ebrius (Osten-Sacken, 1870) c g
 Torymus eglanteriae Mayr, 1874 c g
 Torymus elegantissimus (Ashmead, 1881) c g
 Torymus epilobii Graham & Gijswijt, 1998 c g
 Torymus ermolenkoi Zerova & Seryogina, 2002 c g
 Torymus erucarum (Schrank, 1781) c g
 Torymus eumelis (Walker, 1842) c g
 Torymus eurytomae (Puzanowa-Malysheva, 1936) c g
 Torymus evansi Grissell, 2004 c g
 Torymus ezomatsuanus Kamijo, 2004 c g
 Torymus fagi (Hoffmeyer, 1930) c g
 Torymus fagineus Graham, 1994 c g
 Torymus fagopirum (Provancher, 1881) c g b
 Torymus fastuosus Boheman, 1834 c g
 Torymus favardi Steffan, 1962 c g
 Torymus femoralis (Perez, 1895) g
 Torymus ferrugineipes (Huber, 1927) c g
 Torymus festivus Hobbs, 1950 c g
 Torymus filipendulae Graham & Gijswijt, 1998 c g
 Torymus fischeri Ruschka, 1921 c g
 Torymus flavicoxa (Osten-Sacken, 1870) c g b
 Torymus flavigastris Matsuo, 2012 g
 Torymus flavipes (Walker, 1833) c g
 Torymus flaviventris Ashmead, 1888 c g
 Torymus flavocinctus Kieffer, 1910 c g
 Torymus flavovariegatus Gijswijt, 1990 c g
 Torymus flavus (Goureau, 1851) g
 Torymus floridensis Peck, 1951 c g
 Torymus formosus (Walker, 1833) c g
 Torymus fractiosus Graham & Gijswijt, 1998 c g
 Torymus frankiei Grissell, 1973 c g
 Torymus frater Thomson, 1876 c g
 Torymus frumenti (Dumont-Courset, 1799) g
 Torymus fujianensis Xu & He, 2003 c g
 Torymus fullawayi (Huber, 1927) c g b
 Torymus fulvus (Huber, 1927) c g
 Torymus fuscicornis (Walker, 1833) c g
 Torymus fuscipes Boheman, 1834 c g
 Torymus gahani (Huber, 1927) c g
 Torymus galeobdolonis Graham & Gijswijt, 1998 c g
 Torymus galii Boheman, 1834 c g
 Torymus gansuensis Lin & Xu, 2005 c g
 Torymus genisticola Ruschka, 1921 c g
 Torymus geranii (Walker, 1833) c g
 Torymus giraudianus (Hoffmeyer, 1930) c g
 Torymus globiceps (Retzius, 1783) c g
 Torymus gloriosus Graham & Gijswijt, 1998 c g
 Torymus gracilior Graham, 1994 c g
 Torymus grahami Boucek, 1994 c g
 Torymus guyanaus Cameron, 1913 c g
 Torymus hainesi Ashmead, 1893 c g
 Torymus halimi Graham & Gijswijt, 1998 c g
 Torymus hederae (Walker, 1833) c g
 Torymus helianthi Brodie, 1894 c g
 Torymus helveticus Graham & Gijswijt, 1998 c g
 Torymus heterobiae Graham & Gijswijt, 1998 c g
 Torymus heyeri Wachtl, 1883 c g
 Torymus himachalicus Narendran & Sureshan, 2005 c g
 Torymus hircinus Ashmead, 1894 c g
 Torymus hirsutus (Huber, 1927) c g
 Torymus hobbsi Grissell, 2004 c g
 Torymus holcaspoideus (Ashmead, 1904) c g
 Torymus hornigi Ruschka, 1921 c g
 Torymus huberi (Hoffmeyer, 1929) c g
 Torymus hylesini Graham, 1994 c g
 Torymus iacchos Zavada, 2001 c g
 Torymus igniceps Mayr, 1874 c g
 Torymus impar Rondani, 1877 c g
 Torymus imperatrix Graham & Gijswijt, 1998 c g
 Torymus indicus (Ahmad, 1946) c g
 Torymus interruptus Gijswijt, 2000 c g
 Torymus inulae Wachtl, 1884 c g
 Torymus iraklii Zerova & Seryogina, 2002 c g
 Torymus isajevi Zerova & Dolgin, 1986 c g
 Torymus itoi Matsuo g
 Torymus janetiellae Graham & Gijswijt, 1998 c g
 Torymus josefi Boucek, 1996 c g
 Torymus josephinae Boucek, 1988 c g
 Torymus juniperi (Linnaeus, 1758) c g
 Torymus kaltenbachi Forster, 1840 g
 Torymus kiefferi (Hoffmeyer, 1929) c g
 Torymus kinseyi (Huber, 1927) c g
 Torymus koebelei (Huber, 1927) c g b
 Torymus kononovae (Zerova & Seregina, 1991) c g
 Torymus koreanus Kamijo, 1982 c g
 Torymus kovaci Narendran & Girish Kumar, 2005 c g
 Torymus laetus (Walker, 1833) c g
 Torymus lampros Graham, 1994 c g
 Torymus lapsanae (Hoffmeyer, 1930) c g
 Torymus laricis Boucek, 1994 c g
 Torymus larreae Grissell, 1976 c g
 Torymus lathyri Graham & Gijswijt, 1998 c g
 Torymus latialatus Lin & Xu, 2005 c g
 Torymus lini Mayr, 1874 c g
 Torymus lissus (Walker, 1843) c g
 Torymus lividus (Ashmead, 1885) c g
 Torymus longicalcar Graham, 1994 c g
 Torymus longicauda (Provancher, 1883) c g
 Torymus longior Brodie, 1894 c g b
 Torymus longiscapus Grissell, 1976 c g
 Torymus longistigmus (Huber, 1927) c g
 Torymus loranthi (Cameron, 1913) c g
 Torymus luridus Zavada, 2001 c g
 Torymus lyciicola Kieffer, 1910 c g
 Torymus lythri Boucek, 1994 c g
 Torymus macrurus (Forster, 1859) g
 Torymus maculatus Lin & Xu, 2005 c g
 Torymus maculipennis (Cameron, 1884) c g
 Torymus magnificus (Osten-Sacken, 1870) c g
 Torymus mandrakensis (Risbec, 1956) c g
 Torymus mediocris (Walker, 1874) c g
 Torymus mellipes (Huber, 1927) c g
 Torymus memnonius Grissell, 1973 c g
 Torymus mendocinus Kieffer, 1910 c g
 Torymus mexicanus Ashmead, 1899 c g
 Torymus microcerus (Walker, 1833) c g
 Torymus microstigma (Walker, 1833) c g
 Torymus micrurus Boucek, 1994 c g
 Torymus millefolii Ruschka, 1921 c g
 Torymus minutus Forster, 1840 g
 Torymus missouriensis (Huber, 1927) c g
 Torymus monticola Graham & Gijswijt, 1998 c g
 Torymus montserrati Crawford, 1911 c g
 Torymus multicolor (Huber, 1927) c g
 Torymus myrtacearum (Costa Lima, 1916) c g
 Torymus narvikensis Graham, 1994 c g
 Torymus nebulosus Askew, 2001 c g
 Torymus neepalensis Narendran, 1994 c g
 Torymus nemorum Boucek, 1994 c g
 Torymus neuroterus Ashmead, 1887 c g
 Torymus nigritarsus (Walker, 1833) c g
 Torymus nitidulus (Walker, 1833) c g
 Torymus nobilis Boheman, 1834 c g
 Torymus nonacris (Walker, 1842) c g
 Torymus notatus (Walker, 1833) c g
 Torymus novitzkyi Graham, 1994 c g
 Torymus nubilus (Breland, 1939) c g
 Torymus nudus (Breland, 1939) c g
 Torymus obscurus (Breland, 1939) c g
 Torymus occidentalis (Huber, 1927) c g
 Torymus ochreatus Say, 1836 c g
 Torymus oreiplanus Kieffer, 1910 c g
 Torymus orientalis (Masi, 1926) g
 Torymus orissaensis (Mani, 1936) c g
 Torymus orobi Mayr, 1874 c g
 Torymus osborni (Huber, 1927) c g
 Torymus oviperditor (Gahan, 1927) c g
 Torymus pachypsyllae (Ashmead, 1888) c g
 Torymus pallidipes Ashmead, 1894 c g
 Torymus paludum Graham & Gijswijt, 1998 c g
 Torymus paraguayensis (Girault, 1913) c g
 Torymus partitus Graham & Gijswijt, 1998 c g
 Torymus pascuorum Boucek, 1994 c g
 Torymus pastinacae Graham & Gijswijt, 1998 c g
 Torymus pavidus Say, 1836 c g
 Torymus perplexus (Huber, 1927) c g
 Torymus persicariae Mayr, 1874 c g
 Torymus persimilis Ashmead, 1894 c g
 Torymus philippii (Hoffmeyer, 1929) c g
 Torymus phillyreae Ruschka, 1921 c g
 Torymus poae (Hoffmeyer, 1930) c g
 Torymus potamius Grissell, 1976 c g
 Torymus pretiosus (Walker, 1833) c g
 Torymus problematicus Graham & Gijswijt, 1998 c g
 Torymus prosopidis Kieffer, 1910 c g
 Torymus prunicola (Huber, 1927) c g
 Torymus pseudotsugae Hobbs, 2004 c g
 Torymus pulchellus Thomson, 1876 c g
 Torymus punctifrons (Ashmead, 1894) c g
 Torymus purpurascens (Fabricius, 1798) c g
 Torymus purpureae Graham & Gijswijt, 1998 c g
 Torymus purpureomaculata (Cameron, 1904) c g
 Torymus putoniellae Graham & Gijswijt, 1998 c g
 Torymus pygmaeus Mayr, 1874 c g
 Torymus quadriceps Graham & Gijswijt, 1998 c g
 Torymus quercinus Boheman, 1834 c g
 Torymus racemariae  b
 Torymus ramicola Ruschka, 1921 c g
 Torymus ranomafanensis (Risbec, 1956) (Madagascar)
 Torymus regalis (Walker, 1833) c g
 Torymus resinanae Ratzeburg, 1852 c g
 Torymus rhamni Boucek, 1994 c g
 Torymus rhoditidis (Huber, 1927) c g
 Torymus ringofuschi Kamijo, 1979 c g
 Torymus roboris (Walker, 1833) c g
 Torymus rosariae Graham & Gijswijt, 1998 c g
 Torymus rubi (Schrank, 1781) c g
 Torymus rubigasterus Xu & He, 2003 c g
 Torymus rudbeckiae Ashmead, 1890 c g
 Torymus rufipes (Walker, 1834) c g
 Torymus rugglesi Milliron, 1959 c g b
 Torymus rugosipunctatus Ashmead, 1894 c g
 Torymus ruschkai (Hoffmeyer, 1929) c g
 Torymus salicis Graham, 1994 c g
 Torymus sapporoensis Ashmead, 1904 c g
 Torymus sarothamni Kieffer, 1899 c g
 Torymus scalaris (Huber, 1927) c g
 Torymus scandicus Graham & Gijswijt, 1998 c g
 Torymus scaposus (Thomson, 1876) c g
 Torymus schizothecae Ruschka, 1921 c g
 Torymus scutellaris (Walker, 1833) c g
 Torymus seminum (Hoffmeyer, 1929) c g
 Torymus sharmai Sureshan & Narendran, 2002 c g
 Torymus silenus Zavada, 2001 c g
 Torymus sinensis Kamijo, 1982 c g
 Torymus smithi Ashmead, 1904 c g
 Torymus socius Mayr, 1874 c g
 Torymus solidaginis (Huber, 1927) c g
 Torymus solitarius (Osten-Sacken, 1870) c g b
 Torymus spaici Boucek, 1994 c g
 Torymus speciosus Boheman, 1834 c g
 Torymus sphaerocephalus Graham & Gijswijt, 1998 g
 Torymus spherocephalus de Vere Graham & Gijswit, 1998 g
 Torymus spilopterus Boheman, 1834 c g
 Torymus splendidulus Dalla Torre, 1898 c g
 Torymus stenus Graham, 1994 c g
 Torymus stom Narendran & Sudheer, 2005 c g
 Torymus strenuus (Walker, 1871) c g
 Torymus subcalifornicus Grissell, 1976 c g
 Torymus subnudus Boucek, 1978 c g
 Torymus sulcatus (Huber, 1927) c g
 Torymus superbus Kieffer, 1910 c g
 Torymus sylvicola Ashmead, 1904 c g
 Torymus tanaceticola Ruschka, 1921 c g
 Torymus tatianae Zavada, 2001 c g
 Torymus terentianus Zavada, 2001 c g
 Torymus texanus (Hoffmeyer, 1930) c g
 Torymus thalassinus (Crosby, 1908) c g
 Torymus theon (Walker, 1843) c g
 Torymus thompsoni Fyles, 1904 c g
 Torymus thoracicus (Ashmead, 1904) c g
 Torymus thymi Ruschka, 1921 c g
 Torymus tipulariarum Zetterstedt, 1838 c g
 Torymus triangularis Thomson, 1876 c g
 Torymus tsugae (Yano, 1918) c g
 Torymus tubicola (Osten-Sacken, 1870) c g b
 Torymus ulmariae Ruschka, 1921 c g
 Torymus umbilicatus (Gahan, 1919) c g b
 Torymus valerii Graham & Gijswijt, 1998 c g
 Torymus vallisnierii Cameron, 1901 c g
 Torymus varians (Walker) i c g
 Torymus ventralis (Fonscolombe, 1832) c g
 Torymus verbasci Ruschka, 1921 c g
 Torymus veronicae Ruschka, 1921 c g
 Torymus vesiculi Moser, 1956 c g
 Torymus violae (Hoffmeyer, 1944) c g
 Torymus virescens (De Stefani, 1908) g
 Torymus wachtliellae Graham & Gijswijt, 1998 c g
 Torymus warreni (Cockerell, 1911) c g
 Torymus xanthopus (Schulz, 1906) c g
 Torymus zabriskii  b
 Torymus zhejiangensis Lin & Xu, 2005 c g

Data sources: i = ITIS, c = Catalogue of Life, g = GBIF, b = Bugguide.net

References

Torymus